Remo Williams is the main character in The Destroyer, a series of novels about a United States government operative and Chiun, a martial arts master who is Williams' 'sunseng', analogous to a sensei.

The series was created by Warren Murphy and Richard Sapir.  The first novel of the series was published in 1971.

The novel series main characters were adapted to film in Remo Williams: The Adventure Begins in 1985.  The film series is being adapted a second time; on this occasion, it will simply be called The Destroyer and will be directed by Shane Black.

References

External links
Sinanju.net

Fictional American secret agents
Characters in American novels
Literary characters introduced in 1971